The Weirton–Steubenville, WV–OH Metropolitan Statistical Area, also known as the Upper Ohio Valley, is a metropolitan statistical area consisting of two counties in the Northern Panhandle of West Virginia and one in Ohio, anchored by the cities of Weirton and Steubenville. As of the 2020 census, the MSA had a population of 116,903. This puts it at 334th largest in the United States. It is also included in the larger Pittsburgh–New Castle–Weirton, PA–OH–WV Combined Statistical Area.

Centered around the Ohio River, the Upper Ohio Valley was historically a manufacturing center of the United States due to its strategic transportation location.

Demographics

As of the census of 2000, there were 132,008 people, 54,491 households, and 37,250 families residing within the MSA. The racial makeup of the MSA was 94.50% White, 3.91% African American, 0.16% Native American, 0.34% Asian, 0.02% Pacific Islander, 0.19% from other races, and 0.88% from two or more races. Hispanic or Latino of any race were 0.61% of the population.

The median income for a household in the MSA was $32,531, and the median income for a family was $39,825. Males had a median income of $34,998 versus $19,729 for females. The per capita income for the MSA was $17,110.

Counties
 Brooke County, West Virginia
 Hancock County, West Virginia
 Jefferson County, Ohio

Communities

 Places with more than 15,000 inhabitants
 Steubenville, Ohio (Principal city)
 Weirton, West Virginia (Principal city)
 Places with 1,000 to 10,000 inhabitants
 Chester, West Virginia
 Follansbee, West Virginia
 Hooverson Heights, West Virginia
 Mingo Junction, Ohio
 New Cumberland, West Virginia
 Newell, West Virginia
 Tiltonsville, Ohio
 Toronto, Ohio
 Wellsburg, West Virginia
 Wintersville, Ohio
 Yorkville, Ohio (partial)
 Places with 500 to 1,000 inhabitants
 Adena, Ohio (partial)
 Amsterdam, Ohio
 Beech Bottom, West Virginia
 Bergholz, Ohio
 Bethany, West Virginia
 Dillonvale, Ohio
 Mount Pleasant, Ohio
 Smithfield, Ohio
 Places with fewer than 500 inhabitants
 Bloomingdale, Ohio
 Empire, Ohio
 Irondale, Ohio
 New Alexandria, Ohio
 Rayland, Ohio
 Richmond, Ohio
 Stratton, Ohio
 Unincorporated places

 Arnold, West Virginia
 Brilliant, Ohio
 Chestnut Hill, West Virginia
 Coketown, West Virginia
 Colliers, West Virginia
 Congo, West Virginia
 East Springfield, Ohio
 East Steubenville, West Virginia
 Fairhaven, West Virginia
 Fowlerston, West Virginia
 Greentown, Ohio
 Hammondsville, Ohio
 Hopewell, Ohio
 Kings Creek, West Virginia

 Lawrenceville, West Virginia
 Lennyville, West Virginia
 Moscow, West Virginia
 New Manchester, West Virginia
 New Somerset, Ohio
 Piney Fork, Ohio
 Rockdale, West Virginia
 Short Creek, West Virginia
 Sun Valley, West Virginia
 Weems, Ohio
 Wolf Run, Ohio

 Townships (Jefferson County, Ohio) 
 Brush Creek
 Cross Creek
 Island Creek
 Knox
 Mount Pleasant
 Ross
 Salem
 Saline
 Smithfield
 Springfield
 Steubenville
 Warren
 Wayne
 Wells

See also
 Greater Pittsburgh Region
 West Virginia census statistical areas
 Ohio census statistical areas

References

 
Hancock County, West Virginia
Brooke County, West Virginia
Jefferson County, Ohio
Metropolitan areas of West Virginia
Metropolitan areas of Ohio